Prodoxus pallidus is a moth of the family Prodoxidae. It is found in southern California, United States. The habitat consists of shrubby desert.

The wingspan is 17–25 mm. The forewings are near white to light gray, with scattered dark brown spots and streaks. The hindwings are medium to dark brown.

The larvae feed on Agave species.

References

Moths described in 1967
Prodoxidae